Opole Power Plant is a coal-fired thermal power station 100km from Katowice, Poland. It is Poland's third largest power station with an installed capacity of 3.3 GW.

References

Coal-fired power stations in Poland